Steven Wishnoff is an actor, casting professional and television producer who has twice been nominated for an Emmy Award.

Acting

Television
Wishnoff played Tony Masters, the leader of the gay gang on the HBO television series Oz, from season two until the show's sixth and final season. [1][2]

Other television acting credits include The Richard Bey Show, Mike Nichols's Angels in America for HBO, Sex and the City (episode 1), Late Night with Conan O'Brien, Law & Order, New York Undercover and more.

Film
Wishnoff's film credits include Marcie X, Joel Schumacher's Flawless and Stonewall (the image of his character adorned Stonewall movie posters and soundtrack covers). Additionally, he was John Goodman's stunt and photo double on many film and television projects including Martin Scorsese’s Bringing Out the Dead, Glen Gordon Caron's Now and Again, Coyote Ugly and more. [3][4]

Stage
Wishnoff is also an accomplished stage actor with many Musical Theater credits on his resume. Some of his onstage credits include Albin/Zaz in several productions of La Cage aux Folles, Amos Hart in several productions of Chicago, Vivian McVanish in the Drama Desk Award winning Howard Crabtree's Whoop Dee Doo [3]

Wishnoff was seen regularly in every major (and minor) Piano Bar/Cabaret in New York City as well as several in Amsterdam, The Netherlands and three cities in Norway. Regarding Wishnoff's portrayal of Amos Hart in the Boston production of Chicago, Peter Filicia, a writer for TheaterWeek wrote:

"...Billy Flynn sings the line 'give them an act that's unassailable, they'll wait a week til you're available.' A smart producer would wait a year or two until he (Wishnoff) is available. ...this is as good a portrayal as I have ever seen." [2]

He is also a musician and has performed music and directed quite a few productions and recordings. He was the Musical Director of The Real Live Brady Bunch at the Village Gate Theater in New York City when the original cast moved to the Westwood Playhouse in Los Angeles.

Producing, Writing
Wishnoff is the creator and writer of the multi-award winning web series Life Interrupted starring Mason Reese, Alison Arngrim, Dawn Wells, Erin Murphy, Robbie Rist and Michael Learned. The series has won multiple awards across several festivals including awards for his Direction, Writing, Producing as well as several awards for the shows theme song which he co-wrote with Robbie Rist.

Steven Wishnoff was the writer of the Los Angeles Area EMMYS for 5 years beginning in 2008. He was the Writer and Producer of "LGBT Above and Below the Line"' for The Academy of Television Arts & Sciences (featuring Billy Crystal and hosted by Bruce Vilanch), as well as The Writer and Producer of LGBT Youth in Television: Teens, Tweens and More!" (hosted by Kathy Griffin).Segment Producer of T.V.'s All-Time Funniest for ABC, Senior Writer Producer for Court TV (aka truTV), Supervising Producer (pre-production) for "The Jazz Awards", was the Senior Producer for Nick at Nite and TVLand.com and has written/produced for Kathy Griffin, Danny Bonaduce and Barry Williams (among others).

Casting
His casting and Talent Management/Supervision work has been seen in The Foundation, Celebrity Duets, But Can They Sing, The Word Music Awards, "Knots Landing Reunion: Together Again", "Stage Invasion", "Destroy, Build, Destroy", among others. He is the Talent Producer of the untitled Mason Reese Project for Burt Dubrow Productions.

References

External links
 

Living people
American male actors
1959 births